Hakeem Abdul-Saboor (born November 7, 1987) is an American bobsledder. He competed in the two-man event at the 2018 Winter Olympics. He qualified to represent the United States at the 2022 Winter Olympics.

He is a specialist in the United States Army, and also attended University of Virginia's College at Wise.

References

External links

Hakeem Abdul-Saboor at the United States Olympic & Paralympic Committee

1987 births
Living people
American male bobsledders
American military Olympians
Olympic bobsledders of the United States
Bobsledders at the 2018 Winter Olympics
Bobsledders at the 2022 Winter Olympics
Sportspeople from Hoboken, New Jersey
United States Army soldiers